Oliver Sauter  (born May 9, 1995)  is a Swiss professional wrestler signed to WWE, where he performs on the NXT brand under the ring name Oro Mensah.

Professional wrestling career

Early career (2012–2019)
Sauter wrestled his first match on 12 May 2012 at Swiss Championship Wrestling under the ring name Mr. Exotic Erotic and lost to Belthazar. On 27 October, he teamed with Cash Crash to win the SCW Tag Team Championship, defeating Bad Snake & Magic Sly. The reign lasted until 28 September 2013, when they lost the titles to Pancho & Sancho. He began competing for New European Championship Wrestling in early 2014, where he defeated former tag team partner Cash Crash on 1 February 2014. During the year, he still fought for Swiss Wrestling Entertainment and Classic Wrestling Entertainment. Over time he fought for various other independent promotions, including Westside Xtreme Wrestling, Rising Sun Wrestling, Frontier Championship Wrestling, German Hurricane Wrestling and German Wrestling Federation, winning various titles.

WWE (2019–present)  
On 19 April 2019, Carter made his NXT UK debut in a dark match, which he lost to Kassius Ohno. He was utilized as a jobber until 16 November where he ended his losing streak. He teamed with Ashton Smith to defeat The Outliers (Dorian Mak and Riddick Moss). He returned to the brand on 17 January 2020, where he teamed with Smith to defeat Pretty Deadly (Lewis Howley and Sam Stoker). On 7 March, he participated in a battle royal to determine the next challenger for the NXT UK Championship, but failed to win the match.

On the 2 June 2022 episode of NXT UK, Carter and Smith won the NXT UK Tag Team Championship by defeating previous champions Moustache Mountain (Trent Seven and Tyler Bate) and Die Familie (Teoman and Rohan Raja) in a triple threat match. On the 23 June episode of NXT UK, Carter and Smith were set to defend their titles against NXT 2.0's Josh Briggs and Brooks Jensen, but Smith suffered a knee injury and had to vacate them.

On the September 13, 2022 episode of NXT, a video package was shown to reintroduce Carter under the ring name of Oro Mensah, with his debut announced for the following week's episode. In his debut match, Mensah defeated Grayson Waller to qualify for the NXT North American Championship ladder match at Halloween Havoc. At the event on October 22, Wes Lee won the match. On the November 4 episode of NXT Level Up, Mensah defeated Xyon Quinn.

Championships and accomplishments 
Championship Of Wrestling
cOw Interstate Championship (1 time)
cOw Heavyweight Championship (1 time)

German Wrestling Federation
GWF Tag Team Championship (1 time) – with Senza Volto

German Hurricane Wrestling
GHW Zero Gravity Cup Championship (1 time)

New European Championship Wrestling
New World Heavyweight Championship (1 time)

Swiss Championship Wrestling
SCW Tag Team Championship (1 time) – with Cash Crash

Swiss Wrestling Entertainment
SWE Championship (1 time)

WWE
NXT UK Tag Team Championship (1 time) – with Ashton Smith

References

External links 
 
 
 

1995 births
Living people
Sportspeople from Zürich
Swiss male professional wrestlers
Swiss people of Ghanaian descent
21st-century professional wrestlers
NXT UK Tag Team Champions